Charles Guy Parsloe (5 November 1900 – 8 March 1985), was a British historian, writer and Liberal Party politician.

Background
Parsloe was born the son of Henry Edward Parsloe. He was educated at Stationers' Company's School and University College, London. In 1929 he married Mary Zirphie Munro Faiers. They had two sons and one daughter.

Professional career
Parsloe was Assistant in History at University College, 1925–27; then Secretary and Librarian, Institute of Historical Research, 1927–43. He was Secretary of the Institute of Welding, 1943–67, Hon. Fellow, 1968 and Vice-President of the  International Institute of Welding from 1966–69 (Secretary-General, 1948–66).

Political career
Parsloe was Liberal candidate for the Streatham division at the 1923 General Election. He did not stand for parliament again.

Electoral record

References

1900 births
1985 deaths
Liberal Party (UK) parliamentary candidates
Alumni of University College London